Tommy Robredo was the defending champion, but competed in the 2013 French Open.
Dušan Lajović defeated Robin Haase 7–6(7–4), 6–3 in the final to win the title.

Seeds

Draw

Finals

Top half

Bottom half

References
 Main Draw
 Qualifying Draw

Citta di Caltanissettaandnbsp;- Singles
2013 Singles